Adolf Dahm-Petersen (2 January 1856 – 29 January  1922) was a Norwegian voice specialist and teacher of artistic singing.

Adolf Dahm-Petersen, son of Johan Frode Petersen (1819–1913) and Helena Thalia P. born Dahm (1828–1862), was born in Kristiania, now Oslo. After attending the gymnasium and the Royal Military Academy in Norway, he visited the Universities in Aachen and Karlsruhe. Furthermore, he studied piano with Hanna Bergwitz-Goffeng, music theory with Johan Svendsen, and voice with Emilio Belari. On 11 September 1892 he married Susie Kreuder. His debut in concert was in Carnegie Hall in 1894, after which he gave concerts in the US, Norway and Denmark. He also appeared as a soloist with the Oratorio Society of New York, Sousa's band and the Damrosch Opera Company under the direction of Walter Damrosch. Dahm-Petersen was director of several choral organizations, and was a vocal instructor in the Ithaca Conservatory of Music and Cornell University.

References
 "Grip's" historical souvenir of Cortland, 1899.
 International who's who in music and musical gazetteer, 1918.
 New-York Tribune. August 24, 1896.
 Obituary in Nordisk Tidende, March 16, 1922, p. 8, 1922.

Notes

1856 births
Norwegian Military Academy alumni
Ithaca College faculty
Cornell University faculty
Karlsruhe Institute of Technology alumni
1922 deaths
Norwegian male singers
Voice teachers
Norwegian emigrants to the United States
Musicians from Oslo